This is a timeline of labour issues and events in Canada.

1870s

 1872 – The Toronto Typographical Union goes on strike on March 25 over its demands for a nine-hour workday. Union activity then being a criminal offence, 24 members of the strike committee are jailed for conspiracy as a result of legal action taken by the editor of The Globe, Liberal Party leader George Brown. The protests that follow Brown's actions lead to Parliament passing the Trade Unions Act on June 14 which legalizes trade unions.
 1873 – A first attempt at establishing a national trade union centre is made by the founding of the Canadian Labour Union. It later dissolves in 1878.

1880s
 1883 – The Trades and Labour Congress of Canada (TLC), a Canada-wide central federation of trade unions, is formed.
 1889 – Royal Commission on the Relations of Labour and Capital

1890s
 1894 – Labour Day is made a federal public holiday.

1900s
 1900 – Parliament passes the Conciliation Act and establishes the federal Department of Labour

1910s

 1912–1914 – Great Coal Strike on Vancouver Island, aka Vancouver Island War, after which miner Joseph Mairs died in jail having received no medical attention. A memorial cairn stands in Ladysmith, British Columbia.
 1914 – The Workmen's Compensation Act, the first social insurance legislation in Canadian history, was adopted by the Legislative Assembly of Ontario.
 1917 – The Canadian Labour Party is founded on the initiative of the Trades and Labour Congress of Canada.
 1918 – The shooting death of Albert "Ginger" Goodwin sparks the Vancouver general strike, the first general strike in Canadian history.
 1919 – Western Labour Conference in Calgary leads to creation of One Big Union.
 1919 – Winnipeg general strike

1920s
 1924 – An informal coalition of progressive MPs forms the Ginger Group in the House of Commons to fight for labour and social issues.
 1925 – One coal miner was killed and many injured during a protest as a result of a major strike at the British Empire Steel and Coal Company (BESCO) in New Waterford, Nova Scotia. Davis Day was established in the memory of Bill Davis, the miner who was killed by company police. The labour dispute resulted in the deployment of 2,000 soldiers during the largest peacetime deployment of the Canadian Militia for an internal conflict since the North-West Rebellion of 1885.
 1929 – Death (suspected murder) of trade unionists Rosvall and Voutilainen

1930s
 1931 – Estevan riot
 1932 – Creation of the Co-operative Commonwealth Federation
 1935 – On-to-Ottawa Trek
 1935 – Battle of Ballantyne Pier
 1938 – Bloody Sunday
 1939 – Canada declares war on Germany

1940s

 1940 – The Canadian Congress of Labour is founded following the expulsion of supporters of the Congress of Industrial Organizations from the Trades and Labour Congress of Canada in 1939 as a result of pressure from the American Federation of Labor.
 August 1940 – The first compulsory national unemployment insurance system in Canada is introduced; it comes into operation in July 1941.
 1945 – Ford strike of 1945
 1946 – Introduction of the Rand formula
 1949 – Aggregate union membership in Canada surpasses one million.
 1949 – Asbestos Strike
 1949 – Controversial American labour unionist Hal C. Banks comes to Canada to assist in a labour dispute between rival shipping unions.

1950s
 1952 – First Peace Arch concert by musician and labour activist Paul Robeson
 1956 – The Canadian Labour Congress is formed through the merger of the Trades and Labour Congress of Canada and the Canadian Congress of Labour.
 1956 – The Mine, Mill and Smelter Workers hold a national convention in Sudbury, Ontario, at which singer and activist Paul Robeson gives his first concert outside the United States since being placed under a travel ban by the United States government in 1950.

1960s
 1961 – The New Democratic Party is founded as the successor to the Co-operative Commonwealth Federation and establishes a formal relationship with the organized labour movement.
 September 10, 1961 - A Mine, Mill and Smelter Workers meeting at the Sudbury Arena, regarding the union's controversial proposal to merge with the United Steelworkers, erupts into a riot.
 1963 - Reesor Siding Strike
 1963 – The Canadian Union of Public Employees is formed through from the merger of the National Union of Public Employees and the National Union of Public Service Employees.
 1965 – Wildcat postal strike, leading to the extension of collective bargaining rights to the majority of the public service
 1967 - The international Mine, Mill and Smelter Workers merge with the United Steelworkers. Local 598 in Sudbury, Ontario is the only Mine Mill local in the world to reject the merger, instead continuing operations as an unaffiliated union organization until 1993.
 1968 - Air Canada agents in British Columbia begin work-to-rule over a dispute over the industrial relations department's bargaining methods.
 1969 - Murray-Hill riot

1970s
 1971 – Introduction of paid maternity leave through unemployment insurance
 1975 – Grace Hartman is elected as the second president of the Canadian Union of Public Employees, becoming the first woman to lead a major labour union in North America.
 September 15, 1978 - The Inco Strike of 1978 begins in Sudbury, Ontario. Workers are out on strike for almost nine months, until June 7, 1979.
 June 1979 – The United Food and Commercial Workers is formed through the merger of the Amalgamated Meat Cutters and the Retail Clerks International Union.

1980s
 1985 - The Canadian Auto Workers become independent of their former parent union, the United Auto Workers. This process is later documented in the film Final Offer.
 1986 - Six-month-long strike at the Gainers meatpacking plant in Edmonton

1990s
 1992 - A bomb at the Giant Mine in the Northwest Territories kills nine replacement workers. Striking mine employee Roger Warren is eventually convicted on nine counts of second-degree murder.
 1993 - Local 598 in Sudbury, Ontario, which was the only Mine Mill local in the world not to join the United Steelworkers when the two unions merged in 1967, joins the Canadian Auto Workers.
 1998 - Teenagers Jennifer Wiebe and Tessa Lowinger successfully unionize a McDonald's franchise in Squamish, British Columbia. However, the union is decertified in July 1999.

2000s
 November 22, 2000 - A McDonald's restaurant in Montreal is unionized. The location is closed down on August 31, 2001, with the owner claiming economic pressures due to a rent hike. This is later documented in the film Maxime, McDuff & McDo.
 2004 - CN Rail workers strike
 2005 - Wal-Mart closes its Saguenay, Quebec store which became the first store of its brand in Canada being unionized.
 May 29, 2006 - Toronto Transit Commission workers stage a one-day wildcat strike.
 April 26, 2008 - 2008 Toronto Transit Commission strike
 September 19, 2008 - A fire destroys the historic Sudbury Steelworkers Hall in Sudbury, Ontario.
 December 10, 2008 - OC Transpo drivers and mechanics strike
 June 22, 2009 - 2009 City of Toronto inside and outside workers strike
 July 13, 2009 - Workers at Vale's operations in Sudbury embark on a yearlong strike over contract concessions.

2010s 

July 5, 2010 - A tentative resolution of the Vale strike in Sudbury is announced.
 September 11, 2012 - Ontario Premier Dalton McGuinty and the Liberal party pass Bill 115 'Putting Students First Act 2012', thereby eliminating the rights of all teachers in the province to go on strike for the next two years.  Bill 115 also freezes wages, grants ten sick days per year (down from twenty) and eliminates banked sick days from previous years.  Unions state that this bill is a violation of their members' rights under the Charter of Rights and Freedoms and that the bill violates the Ontario Labour Relations Act of 1995.
 February 4, 2012 - in Halifax, Amalgamated Transit Union went on strike, crippling the city's public transportation until March 14, 2012. Transit workers were denied salary or compensation increases, due to a reported $3M deficit.
 2013 – Unifor is formed through the merger of the Canadian Auto Workers and the Communications, Energy and Paperworkers Union of Canada, becoming the largest private-sector union in the country.
 2019 - SMWIA ICI members Go on strike in Ontario for 8 weeks May - June first strike in 30 years for that organization.

See also
 Timeline of labour in Greater Sudbury

Footnotes

References

External links 
Records of Mayworks labour festival are held by Simon Fraser University's Special Collections and Rare Books

Labour issues and events in Canada
Labour issues and events in Canada